Mindhola River is a river in western India in Gujarat whose origin is near Doswada, Songadh.

References

Rivers of Gujarat
Rivers of India